Ecstasy is the second studio album by American singer Avant. It was released by MCA Records and Magic Johnson Music on March 26, 2002 in the United States. The singer reteamed with Steve "Stone" Huff to produce the majority of the album. It debuted and peaked at number six on the US Billboard 200 and number two on the Top R&B/Hip-Hop Albums, selling more than 713,000 copies. Ecstasy produced three singles, including "Makin' Good Love", "Don't Say No, Just Say Yes" and "You Ain't Right".

Critical reception

Alex Henderson from Allmusic found that "creatively, Avant's sophomore album, Ecstasy, is a step forward for the Cleveland-based urban contemporary singer. This 2002 release isn't perfect – some of the tracks are routine and pedestrian. But Ecstasy contains more gems than My Thoughts [...] For every minus that you can find on this release, there are three or four pluses."

Track listing 
All tracks are produced by Steve "Stone" Huff.

Charts

Weekly charts

Year-end charts

Certifications

References

2002 albums
Avant albums
MCA Records albums